Suplee is an unincorporated historic community in eastern Crook County, Oregon, United States. The Suplee area was settled by people of French and Métis descent from the French Prairie area in Marion County, including the great-granddaughter of Étienne Lucier.

When Suplee post office was established in 1894, resident Charles Dorling suggested the name "Suplee," his mother's maiden name. The post office ran intermittently, closing for good in 1943, with mail to Paulina.

As of 1972, author Ralph Friedman said there was nothing left at the old townsite, although there were still a few ranch buildings in the area.

At one time there was a Suplee School. Suplee (DeLore) Cemetery is listed by the Oregon Parks and Recreation Department as a historic cemetery.

The area is known for having the oldest sedimentary rocks in the state. The geologic area of the Suplee Formation is often referred to as the Suplee-Izee area.

Further reading

References

External links
Images of Suplee from Flickr
Image of Suplee School before collapse from Flickr
Image of Suplee School after collapse

Unincorporated communities in Crook County, Oregon
Unincorporated communities in Oregon